Sevenoaks is a town in Kent, England. The following is a list of pages of people who were born, live or have lived in the town, or made some important contribution to it. Please add only notable people with a Wikipedia page.

Notable people from Sevenoaks


A
John Miller Adye (1819–1900)  Army officer
Jeffrey Amherst, 1st Baron Amherst (1717–97)  colonial governor of Massachusetts
William Amherst (c. 1732–1781) Army officer
William Amherst, 3rd Earl Amherst (1836–1910) Member of Parliament, Freemason
Geoffrey Anson (1922–77) cricketer
Charles Robert Ashbee (1863–1942) member of Arts & Crafts Movement

B
Cheryl Baker (born 1954) singer in Bucks Fizz and TV presenter
Reg Balch (1894–1994) Canadian photographer and scientist
Anton du Beke (born 1966)  ballroom dancer
Douglas Booth (born 1992) actor
Thomas Bourchier (c. 1404–1486) Archbishop of Canterbury, Lord Chancellor
William Bowra (1752–1820) cricketer
Matthew Branton (born 1968) novelist
Bill Bruford (born 1949) drummer for bands such as Yes and King Crimson

C
Hugh Cecil (born 1889)  photographer
Mike Conway (born 1983)  2006 British Formula Three and 2019–20 FIA World Endurance Championship champion
Simon Cope (born 1966) cyclist

D
Anne Seymour Damer (1748–1828) sculptor
W. H. Davies (1871–1940) poet and tramp
Daniel Day-Lewis (born 1957) actor, attended Sevenoaks School in his early teens
Christopher Don (Donny) (born 1984) disc jockey, drum and bass artist
John Donne (1572–1631) metaphysical poet and Dean of Old St Paul's Cathedral
Diana Princess of Wales attended West Heath School in Sevenoaks.

E
Joan Adeney Easdale (1913–1989), poet, was born here.
John Epps (1805–69) homeopathic physician; religious dissenter

F
John Farey (1791–1851)  mechanical engineer
John Frith (1503–1533) priest and writer

G
Philip Game (1876–1961) Metropolitan Police Commissioner; Governor of New South Wales
Walter Gilliat (1869–1963) priest, Association football player
Cathy Gilliat-Smith (born 1981) England and Great Britain field hockey player
Paul Greengrass (born 1955) film director and screenwriter
George Grote (1794–1871) historian

H
Paul Hartnoll (born 1968) musician (Orbital)
Brian Hord (born 1934) politician
George Henry Horton (born 1993) filmmaker
John Humphrys (born 1943) radio broadcaster
Gloria Hunniford (born 1940)  radio and television personality
John Hurt (born 1940) actor

K
Janet Kear (1933–2004) ornithologist
Caron Keating (1962–2004) TV presenter
Sam King (1911–2003) golfer
John Kirk (1832–1922) Scottish physician, naturalist, companion to explorer David Livingstone, British Consul in Zanzibar
John Buxton Knight (1843–1908) landscape painter
Dick Knowles (1917–2008) MP

L
Justine Lord (born 1938) actress

M
Joseph Miller (died 1794) cricketer
John Minshull (c. 1741–1793) cricketer
Sarah Morris (born 1967) British-born American artist and filmmaker based in New York
Netta Muskett (1887–1963) novelist

P
Lance Percival (born 1933) actor, comedian and singer
Edward Plunkett, 18th Baron of Dunsany (1878–1957) President of Sevenoaks Boy Scouts Association and Sevenoaks Chess Club

R
Val Romney (c. 1718–1773) cricketer

S
Lionel Sackville-West, 2nd Baron Sackville (1827–1908) diplomat
Lionel Sackville-West, 6th Baron Sackville (1913–2004) stockbroker
Vita Sackville-West (1892–1962) author, member of the Bloomsbury group
John Salako (born 1969) association footballer
James Sharman (living) TV producer and sportscaster; host of The Footy Show on The Score
Peter Sissons (1942 - 2019) newsreader
Philip Stanhope, 1st Baron Weardale (1847–1923)  politician and philanthropist
Tilda Swinton (born 1960) actress, attended West Heath School, Sevenoaks
Plum Sykes (born 1969) fashion writer and novelist

T
Andy Titterrell (born 1981) England rugby union international
Edward Thomas (1878–1917) poet and journalist

W
Tom Warren (born 1983) rugby union player 
H. G. Wells (1866–1946) novelist and science fiction writer
James Whitbourn (born 1963) composer
Charlie Whiting (1952-2019) Formula One race director

Y
Lizzy Yarnold (born 1988) Skeleton racer, most successful British Winter Olympian of all time

Z
Robert Charles Zaehner (1913–1974), British academic whose field of study was Eastern religions.

References

People from Sevenoaks
Sevenoaks